Of a Fire on the Moon is a work of non-fiction by Norman Mailer which was serialised in Life magazine in 1969 and 1970, and published in 1970 as a book. It is a documentary and reflection on the Apollo 11 Moon landing from Mailer's point of view.

Writing and publication

After spending time at the space center and Mission Control in Houston, and witnessing the launch of the Saturn V at Cape Kennedy in Florida, Mailer began writing his account of the historic voyage at his home in Provincetown, Massachusetts, during marathon writing sessions to meet his deadlines for the magazine. His account, which ran to 115,000 words, was published between August 1969 and January 1970 in three long installments—A Fire on the Moon, The Psychology of Astronauts, and A Dream of the Future's Face.

In a foreword to Mailer's first installment, Life Managing Editor Ralph Graves introduced "some 26,000 words—the longest non-fiction piece Life has ever published in one issue."

On February 26, 1970, after the magazine series had concluded, Mailer wrote to Apollo 11 commander, Neil Armstrong, "I've worked as assiduously as any writer I know to portray the space program in its largest, not its smallest, dimension".

His account was published as a book called Of a Fire on the Moon in 1970. In the UK, it was published with its original article title, A Fire on the Moon.

Critical reception
Alvin Kernan, in his book The Imaginary Library, included a chapter on Of a Fire on the Moon, arguing that Mailer's book is representative of the declining relevance of the Romantic conception of literature to the present day.

$112,500 coffee table edition
The 40th anniversary of the first Moon landing was marked in 2009 by the release of an abridged, limited edition of the text, re-packaged with images from NASA and Life magazine. This production retitled the work, MoonFire, and was presented in an aluminium box with a lid shaped like the crater-pocked surface of the Moon; the object was mounted on four legs resembling the Apollo Lunar Module's struts. Thus, the coffee table book came inside its own lunar-themed "coffee table", with an uneven surface (see photograph). The package included a numbered print of the famous portrait of Buzz Aldrin standing on the Moon, framed in plexiglass and signed by the astronaut himself—and enclosed a lunar meteorite. Only 12 were created and the price was $112,500.

Norman Mailer died two years before the package was launched.

A conventional hard back edition of the same volume was released in 2015.

Painting on first edition cover

The painting on the cover of the first edition (Little, Brown & Co, 1970) is Le Monde Invisible, a 1954 oil painting by René Magritte. Mailer describes seeing this painting in Chapter 5 ("A Dream of the Future's Face") of the first part ("Aquarius"). "In the foyer was a painting by Magritte, a startling image of a room with an immense rock situated in the center of the floor." The 1970 dust jacket cites that the painting is part of a private collection.

Editions and title variations

 Life serializations:
 Part I: "A Fire on the Moon" — Life magazine, 29 August 1969.
 Part II: "The Psychology of Astronauts" — Life magazine, 14 November 1969.
 Part III: "A Dream of the Future's Face" — Life magazine, 9 January 1970.
 Of a Fire on the Moon — Little, Brown & Co, Boston, 1970, .
 A Fire on the Moon — Weidenfeld & Nicolson, London, 1970, .
 MoonFire: The Epic Journey of Apollo 11 — Taschen GmbH, Köln, 2009, .

Resources
 Gallery of Mailer's research materials, hand written notes, and manuscripts for this book. Norman Mailer archive at the University of Texas.

References

Further reading

Notes

Non-fiction books by Norman Mailer
American non-fiction books
Spaceflight books
Apollo 11
Works originally published in Life (magazine)
Literature first published in serial form
Little, Brown and Company books
Weidenfeld & Nicolson books
1970 non-fiction books